This is a list of time zones from release  of the tz database.

Legend

Type
 Canonical - The primary, preferred zone name.
 Link - An alternative name (alias) which links to a canonical zone.
 Link - A standard Link (as above). The dagger symbol (†) signifies that the zone was canonical in a previous version of the database.  Historical data for such zones is still preserved in the source code, but it is not included when compiling the database with standard options.

UTC offset
Standard Time (STD) and Daylight Saving Time (DST) offsets from UTC in hours and minutes.
For zones in which Daylight Saving is not observed, the DST offset shown in this table is a simple duplication of the STD offset.
The UTC offsets are based on the current or upcoming database rules. This table does not attempt to document any of the historical data which resides in the database.

Time Zone abbreviations
Time zone abbreviations for both Standard Time and Daylight Saving Time are shown exactly as they appear in the database.  See strftime and its "%Z" field.
Some of zone records use 3 or 4 letter abbreviations that are tied to physical time zones, others use numeric UTC offsets.

List

See also 
tz database
List of time zone abbreviations
Abolition of time zones

Notes

References

Further reading
 For a complete and accurate history of each time zone, refer to the data and commentary in the TZ database itself.